Ashley Down is an area in the north of Bristol.  It lies on high ground east of Bishopston, north of St Andrews and St Werburghs, west of Muller Road and south of Horfield. The main artery is Ashley Down Road. Since May 2016 it is part of the Bishopston & Ashley Down ward of Bristol City Council.

Ashley Down was developed in Victorian times.  A number of large detached villas were built on Ashley Down Road.  Smaller terraced houses were built in the north of the district.

Muller Homes 

In 1845 George Müller entered into a contract for the purchase of 7 acres (28,000 m2) of ground at £120 per acre (£0.03/m2) for the accommodation, feeding, clothing and education of 300 destitute and orphan children. On 18 June 1849 the orphans transferred to the new building, designed by local architect Thomas Foster. By the time he died in 1898, Müller had received £1,500,000 through prayer and had over 10,000 children in his care.

The orphanage continued on the Ashley Down site until 1958.  Orphan Houses 2, 4 and 5 are now owned by Bristol City College, while No 3 House (in which Müller lived for the last few years of his life and in which he died), on the other side of Ashley Down Road was converted into private flats in 2007.  No 1 House is currently (2010) being redeveloped as flats.

In 1958 the buildings became Bristol College of Science and Technology (more recently changed to City of Bristol College, Brunel Campus). The site has been used as the film set for the BBC television series Casualty. Muller Road, which runs near the site of the orphanage, is named after its founder.

County Cricket Ground 

In 1889 W.G. Grace bought some land at Ashley Down, which became and remained the home of Gloucestershire County Cricket Club.  The ground has a capacity of 8,000.

In July 2009, Gloucestershire C.C.C. announced plans to redevelop the ground into a 20,000 capacity stadium. The ground will also include a "world class" media centre and conference facilities.  In March 2010, Bristol City Council gave the go-ahead for the new ground.

Once completed, the ground will be one of the biggest cricketing venues in England and, as a result, the club hopes it will become a regular venue for international matches and one of the host grounds of the 2019 Cricket World Cup.

Ashley Down Old Boys' RFC is a rugby club playing in Gloucestershire League I. They are members of the Bristol Combination.

Transportation 
Between 1864 and 1964 Ashley Down was served by Ashley Hill railway station. The site of the station is scheduled to be redeveloped and reopened as Ashley Down station in 2021 as part of the MetroWest scheme.

References

External links 
 Geograph of the Ashley Down area

Areas of Bristol